William Cowper Smith (1843 – 5 March 1911) was a Liberal Party Member of Parliament in New Zealand.

Biography

William Cowper Smith was born in London on 28 December 1843, went to Queen Elizabeth's School, Barnet, arrived on the Egmont at Lyttelton on 7 July 1862, went to Auckland, received a war medal for service during the invasion of the Waikato and moved to Waipukurau in 1872, where he ran a drapery and general store. In 1877 he was elected to Waipukurau Road Board and from 1879 was on Waipawa County Council.

Smith defeated John Davies Ormond to represent the Waipawa electorate from 1881 to 1887. His victory was narrow and described by one paper as a defeat of squatocracy; the 1891 Liberal government introduced reforms to break up large farms whose owners had often moved abroad. In the next election Smith was elected in the Woodville electorate, from 1887 to 1890 (the electorate only existed for those three years), then the Waipawa electorate again from 1890 to 1893, when he retired, due to poor health.

On 13 December 1895, he was appointed to the Legislative Council. At the expiry of the seven-year terms, he was reappointed on 13 December 1902 and on 13 December 1909. He remained a member until his death on 5 March 1911. For three periods between 1902 and 1908, he was Chairman of Committees of the Legislative Council. He had been the government's preferred candidate as Chairman of Committees in 1901 but W. D. H. Baillie won the election and was confirmed for another (his last) session.

He married Emma Augusta Tester, on 14 January 1874. His eldest son was Charles Cowper Smith, born on 16 Jan 1875, who became chairman of Hawke's Bay County Council. Emma died on 17 November 1882, aged 35. Two years after her death, he married Georgina Annie Grant, on 12 August 1884. Their son, Marcus Smith, was mayor of Dannevirke and was considered for the Reform candidate for Pahiatua. Georgina died on 17 February 1962, aged 100. By his two marriages he had several sons and daughters. He died of pneumonia and was buried at Waipukurau Cemetery.

Notes

References

|-

1843 births
1911 deaths
New Zealand Liberal Party MPs
Members of the New Zealand Legislative Council
Members of the New Zealand House of Representatives
New Zealand MPs for North Island electorates
19th-century New Zealand politicians